Xinchengzi Town is a town located in the Miyun District of Beijing, China. It borders Liangjianfang and Laowa Townships in the north, Wulingshan Town in the east and south, as well as Gubeikou and Taishitun Towns in the west. It had 6,528 residents under its administration as of 2020.

The name Xinchengzi comes from Xinchengzi Village, the place in which the town's government is located. It literally means "New City".

Geography 
Xinchengzi is situated foothill of Mount Wuling, which is part of the larger Yan Mountain Range. Andamu River flows western through the town.

The town is connected to the Beijing-Chengde Expressway, as well as the city-level Songcao Road.

History

Administrative divisions 
By 2021, Xinchengzi Town was composed of 19 subdivisions, where 1 was a community and 18 were villages. They can be seen in the list down below:

Gallery

See also 
 List of township-level divisions of Beijing

References

Miyun District
Towns in Beijing